Yuzband (also Romanized as Yūzband; also known as Uzband) is a village in Peyghan Chayi Rural District, in the Central District of Kaleybar County, East Azerbaijan Province, Iran. At the 2006 census, its population was 574, in 153 families.

References 

Populated places in Kaleybar County